The 1944–45 season was Chelsea Football Club's sixth season of wartime football during the Second World War. As the Football League and the FA Cup were suspended for the duration, the club instead competed in regional competitions. Records and statistics for these matches are considered unofficial. Due to the disruption of the war, the club often fielded guest players from other clubs. Chelsea finished 4th in the 18-team Football League South, and won the Southern Football League Cup, beating Millwall 2–0 at Wembley. Chelsea also contested a play-off against the winners of the North Football League Cup, Bolton Wanderers, which Bolton won 2–1.

Notes

References

External links
 Chelsea in the Second World War at chelseafc.com

1944–45
English football clubs 1944–45 season